Begur, Dharwad is a village in Dharwad district of Karnataka, India.

Demographics
As of the 2011 Census of India there were 585 households in Begur and a total population of 2,839 consisting of 1,488 males and 1,351 females. There were 384 children ages 0-6.

References=

Villages in Dharwad district